Pas de deux (released as Duo in the United States) is a 1968 short dance film by Norman McLaren, produced by the National Film Board of Canada.

Production
Pas de deux is choreographed to Romanian pan pipe music by Ludmilla Chiriaeff. Ballerina (Margaret Mercier) dances by herself (or rather, with images of herself), before being joined by (Vincent Warren), to perform the pas de deux of the title, 

It was filmed in a studio where the walls and floor were painted black. Lighting was from the sides, so only the dancers' silhouettes appear, and their images are repeatedly multiplied.

The film was photographed on high contrast stock, with optical, step-and-repeat printing, for a sensuous and almost stroboscopic appearance. as choreographed by Ludmilla Chiriaeff.

Awards
 22nd British Academy Film Awards, London: BAFTA Award for Best Short Animation, 1969
 BFI London Film Festival, London: Outstanding Film of the Year, 1968
 Chicago International Film Festival, Chicago: Special Plaque of the Jury, 1968 
 20th Canadian Film Awards, Toronto: Special Prize for Outstanding Artistic Achievement, 1968
 FIBA International Festival of Buenos Aires, Buenos Aires: Silver Cabildo for the Most Original Film, 1968
 Cambodia International Film Festival, Phnom Penh: First Prize, Short Film, 1968
 Locarno Film Festival, Locarno, Switzerland: Diploma of Honour, 1968
 Melbourne International Film Festival, Melbourne: Grand Prize, Short Subject, 1969
 Film Critics and Journalists Association of Ceylon, Colombo, Sri Lanka: Golden Plaque, Short Film, 1969
 International Film Festival of Ballet, Nervi: Silver Orchid Award, 1969
 Yorkton Film Festival, Yorkton, Saskatchewan: First Place, Creative Art, 1969
 Colombo International Film Festival, Colombo, Sri Lanka: Honourable Mention, Short Film, 1969
 Salerno Short Film Festival, Salerno, Italy: Trophy of the Festival, 1970
Panama International Film Festival, Panama City, Panama: Award for Best Short Film, 1970
 International Festival of Short Films, Philadelphia: Top Film of the Festival, 1971
 American Film and Video Festival, New York: Blue Ribbon, 1970
 American Film and Video Festival, New York: Emily Award, 1970
 Festival of Music and Dance, Menton: Prize of the Secretary of State to the Prime Minister in charge of Youth, Sports and Leisure, 1971
 41st Academy Awards, Los Angeles: Nominee (as Duo): Best Live Action Short Subject, 1969

References

Collins, Maynard (1976). Norman McLaren (Canadian film series): Canadian Film Institute. ASIN B0006CVBIW

Works cited

External links

1960s dance films
1968 films
1968 animated films
BAFTA winners (films)
Ballet films
Canadian animated short films
Canadian black-and-white films
Films directed by Norman McLaren
Animated films without speech
National Film Board of Canada animated short films
Quebec films
Canadian dance films
1960s animated short films
1960s Canadian films